Maksim Yuryevich Vasilyev (born 2 September 1974) is a Russian professional football coach and a former player.

Club career
He made his Russian Football National League debut for FC Energomash Belgorod on 6 May 1992 in a game against FC APK Azov.

External links
 

1974 births
People from Belgorod
Living people
Soviet footballers
Russian footballers
Association football defenders
FC Dynamo Moscow reserves players
FC Rostov players
FC Fakel Voronezh players
FC Salyut Belgorod players
FC Metallurg Lipetsk players
Russian football managers
FC Arsenal Tula players
Sportspeople from Belgorod Oblast